Marie Wagner (February 2, 1883 – April 1, 1975 or March 28, 1975) was an American tennis champion.

Biography
Wagner was born on February 2, 1883, in Freeport, New York. An outstanding tennis player, she won the United States Indoor Championships a record number of times. In the singles event, she won the title six times (1908, 1909, 1911, 1913, 1914, and 1917) while in doubles, she was successful in 1910, 1913 (with Clara Kutross), 1916 (with Molla Mallory) and in 1917 (with Margaret Taylor).

At the U.S. National Championships, her best showing was reaching the final in 1914 which she lost in three sets to reigning champion Mary Browne.

Wagner was ranked in the Top 10 in the U.S. between 1913 (the first year women were ranked) and 1920. She achieved her highest national ranking of No.3 in 1914.

She was inducted into the International Tennis Hall of Fame in 1969. Wagner died in 1975.

Grand Slam finals

Singles (1 runner-up)

References

External links

1883 births
1975 deaths
International Tennis Hall of Fame inductees
American female tennis players
Tennis people from New York (state)